Naam Pirandha Mann is a 1977 Indian Tamil-language vigilante action film directed by A. Vincent. The film stars Sivaji Ganesan, Gemini Ganesan and K. R. Vijaya, while Kamal Haasan, Nagesh and Fatafat Jayalaxmi play supporting roles. It was released on 7 October 1977. The story served as base line for the film Indian.

Plot 
During the British Raj, Vettaikara Thevar is a rich landlord who lives with his wife Devanayaki and younger sister Valliyammai. He is in the good books of the people and the British. Unknown to his family, he is also Santhana Thevar, the masked vigilante leader of a group that terrorizes the British colonizers in town and helps the locals. 

Joseph, a former soldier, joins Santhana Thevar's group and also works for Vettaikara Thevar, unaware that both are the same man. Thevar is hurt during a mission and Joseph rescues him sacrificing himself and is presumed dead. Eventually, the British learn his secret identity and Valliyammai is raped publicly and murdered in an attempt to draw out Thevar. He comes out in rage, murders the perpetuators and bound by a promise he made to Devanayaki, he surrenders. He escapes his death sentence at the last moment and is freed as India gains independence. He, however, has already been financially ruined.

Years later, the Thevar family is now reduced to penury and Thevar's son Ranjith is a bitter young man. He resents the fact that his father's sacrifices have resulted in only misery for the family and that the country is ungrateful to freedom fighters. He also hates the fact that even in poverty, his father refuses pension on account of self-respect. The two clash due to their contrasting world views. Ranjith, at one time, has had enough and takes to crime. In the end, Thevar finds out that his own son is betraying the country he fought so hard to free and takes his gun again as Santhana Thevar. Does the father get killed or does the son?

Cast 
Sivaji Ganesan as Santhana Thevar / Vettaikara Thevar
Gemini Ganesan as Joseph
K. R. Vijaya as Devanayaki
Kamal Haasan as Ranjith
Fatafat Jayalaxmi as Valliyammai
Nagesh as Thavasu

Soundtrack 
The music was composed by M. S. Viswanathan, with lyrics by Kannadasan.

Release and reception 
The 1996 Tamil film Indian's story is loosely based on this film.

References

External links 
 

1970s Tamil-language films
1970s vigilante films
1977 action films
1977 films
Films directed by A. Vincent
Films scored by M. S. Viswanathan
Films set in the British Raj
Indian action films
Indian vigilante films